Karen Ludwig may refer to:
 Karen Ludwig (politician)
 Karen Ludwig (actress)